Qualification for the 2021 Little League World Series took place across eight United States regions. The first regional tournament began on August 5 and the final tournament concluded on August 14. As a result of the COVID-19 pandemic, Little League Baseball made the decision to hold the tournament without teams from outside of the United States for the first time since . Instead, the top two teams from each U.S. region qualified for the final tournament. In all, 53 teams were invited to the regional tournaments; two from California, two from Texas, one each from the other 48 states, and one from the District of Columbia.

Great Lakes 
The tournament took place in Whitestown, Indiana, during August 8–14. On August 11, the team from Kentucky was removed from tournament play due to having at least one positive COVID-19 test.

Mid-Atlantic 
The tournament took place in Bristol, Connecticut, during August 8–14.

Midwest 
The tournament took place in Whitestown, Indiana, during August 7–14.

New England 
The tournament took place in Bristol, Connecticut, during August 8–14.

Northwest 
The tournament took place in San Bernardino, California, during August 8–14. On August 7, the team from Alaska was removed from tournament play due to having at least one positive COVID-19 test.

Southeast 
The tournament took place in Warner Robins, Georgia, during August 6–11. On August 7, the team from North Carolina was removed from further tournament play due to having at least one positive COVID-19 test.

Southwest 
The tournament took place in Waco, Texas, during August 5–10. On August 6, the teams from Oklahoma, Mississippi, and Texas East were all removed from further tournament play due to each team having at least one positive COVID-19 test. This resulted in a reworking of the schedule, causing the championship game to be moved up a day from its originally planned date of August 11.

West 
The tournament took place in San Bernardino, California, during August 8–14. On August 10, the team from Arizona was removed from tournament play due to having at least one positive COVID-19 test.

References

2021 Little League World Series
2021 in baseball
2021 in sports in Indiana
2021 in sports in Connecticut
2021 in sports in California
2021 in sports in Georgia (U.S. state)
2021 in sports in Texas